The Magyar Kupa Final was the final match of the 2009–10 Magyar Kupa, played between Debrecen and Zalaegerszegi.

Route to the final

Match

References

External links
 Official site 

2010
Debreceni VSC matches
Zalaegerszegi TE matches